This is the list of rectors of Moscow State University. Since the foundation of the university in 1755 there were 44 rectors.

Alexei Argamakov 1755–1757
Ivan Melissino 1757–1763
Mikhail Kheraskov 1763–1770
Mikhail Priklonsky 1771–1784
Pavel Fonvizin 1784–1796
Ivan Turgenev 1796–1803
Khariton Chebotaryov 1803–1805
Pyotr Strakhov 1805–1807
Feodor Bause 1807–1808
Ivan Geim 1808–1819
Anton Antonsky-Prokopovich 1819–1826
Ivan Dvigubsky 1826–1833
Alexei Boldyrev 1833–1836
Mikhail Kachenovsky 1836–1842
Arkady Alfonsky 1842–1848
Dmitri Perevoshchikov 1848–1850
Arkady Alfonsky 1850–1863
Sergey Barshev 1863–1870
Sergey Solovyov 1871–1877
Nikolay Tikhonravov 1877–1883
Nikolay Bogolepov 1883–1887
Nikolay Tikhonravov 1887–1891
Gavriil Ivanov 1891–1893
Nikolay Bogolepov 1893–1895
Pavel Nekrasov 1895–1898
Nikolai Andreevich Zverev 1898
Dmitri Zernov 1898–1899
Aleksandr Tikhomirov 1899–1904
Leonid Lakhtin 1904–1905
Sergei Trubetskoy 1905
Alexander Manuilov 1905–1911
Matvei Lyubavsky 1911–1917
Mikhail Menzbir 1917–1919
Vladimir Gulevich 1919
Mikhail Novikov 1919–1920
Dmitri Bogolepov 1920–1921
Viacheslav Volgin 1921–1925
Andrey Vyshinsky 1925–1928
Ivan Udaltsov 1928–1930
Vasiliy Kasatkin 1930–1934
Alexei Butyagin 1934–1943
Ilya Galkin 1943–1947
Alexander Nesmeyanov 1948–1951
Ivan Petrovsky 1951–1973
Rem Khokhlov 1973–1977
Anatoly Logunov 1977–1992
Viktor Sadovnichiy 1992–present

See also 

 List of Moscow State University people

External links
Heads of Moscow University

Moscow State University
Moscow State
Moscow State